Ardill is a hamlet in RM of Lake Johnston No. 102, Saskatchewan, Canada. Listed as a designated place by Statistics Canada, the hamlet had a listed population of 0 in the Canada 2006 Census.

All that currently remains is the bar which was issued liquor licence #1. Ardill is located between Assiniboia and Moose Jaw, south of Old Wives Lake and at the northern end of Lake of the Rivers.

Demographics 
Ardill, like so many other small communities throughout Saskatchewan, has struggled to maintain a population resulting in a ghost town with no population. Previously, Ardill was incorporated under village status, but was restructured as a hamlet under the jurisdiction of the Rural municipality of Lake Johnston.

In 2001, Ardill had a population of 0, the same as in 1996.

Infrastructure 
The former Saskatchewan Transportation Company provided intercity bus service to Ardill.

See also 
 List of communities in Saskatchewan
 Hamlets of Saskatchewan

References 

Former designated places in Saskatchewan
Former villages in Saskatchewan
Hamlets in Saskatchewan
Ghost towns in Saskatchewan
Lake Johnston No. 102, Saskatchewan
Division No. 3, Saskatchewan